Gary Al-Smith is a Ghanaian sports journalist who reports locally and for international media – with a focus on African football. He is also a global shaper and a UNICEF ambassador. He initially worked with Citi FM however moved and is currently with Multimedia Group Limited radio station  Joy FM based in Accra in the greater Accra Region of Ghana. He does stories for Guardian, BBC, CNN, the New York Times and SuperSport.

References

Ghanaian radio journalists
Ghanaian sports journalists
UNICEF Goodwill Ambassadors
Living people
Year of birth missing (living people)
Presbyterian Boys' Senior High School alumni